Kocioł Duży  is a village in the administrative district of Gmina Pisz, within Pisz County, Warmian-Masurian Voivodeship, in northern Poland.

There is no German name for this village because it did not exist before 1945.

References

Villages in Pisz County